Mitternacht (German "midnight") may refer to:

Television
"Mitternacht, Switzerland", fictional town in an episode of U.S. television series "Perry Mason" titled "The Case of a Place Called Midnight", originally aired on 11/12/1964.

Music
"Mitternacht", song by E Nomine
Mitternacht (La Fee song)
"Mitternacht", song by Kraftwerk from Autobahn (album)

See also
Mitternacht - The Dark Night of the Soul, 2014 album by German darkwave-neofolk project Sopor Aeternus.
Mitternacht, album by punk band Dödelhaie :de:Dödelhaie